The 1997 Yale Bulldogs football team represented Yale University in the 1997 NCAA Division I-AA football season.  The Bulldogs were led by first-year head coach Jack Siedlecki, played their home games at the Yale Bowl and finished in seventh place in the Ivy League.

Yale's record book lists a 1–9 record for 1997, 0–7 in Ivy League play. The Ivy League record book, however, credits Yale with a conference win after Penn forfeited its victories. Yale is thus recorded by the league as its seventh-place finisher in 1997, ahead of Penn.

Schedule

Note

References

Yale
Yale Bulldogs football seasons
Yale Bulldogs football